Equatorial may refer to something related to:

Earth's equator
the tropics, the Earth's equatorial region
tropical climate
the Celestial equator
equatorial orbit
equatorial coordinate system
equatorial mount, of telescopes
 equatorial bond, a type of chemical bond orientation

See also 
 
 Equator (disambiguation)